Polonia London VC is a semi-professional volleyball team based in London, Great Britain. The club plays in the Super League, highest level of the English Volleyball League. The male section of the club is named IBB Polonia London (since 2013), the female section is named Polonia SideOut London.

Achievements

Men's
 English Championship 
  (x7) 1986, 2011, 2013, 2016, 2017, 2019, 2020
  (x6) 1984, 1987, 1991, 1994, 2012, 2018
  (x1) 2007
 English Cup
  (x2) 2016, 2017
 NEVZA Championship
  (x1) 2019

Women's
 English Championship 
  (x1) 2011
  (x6) 2010, 2012, 2013, 2014, 2015, 2016
 English Cup
  (x3) 2010, 2011, 2016
 NEVZA Championship 
  (x1) 2020

History
The club was set up in 1973 by Maciej Behnke and Henryk Pauliński, members of the Polish YMCA. The female section of the club was founded by sisters Bożena and Grażyna Zajączkowska in 1980. Both sections, male and female, compete in the highest level of the English National Volleyball League, the National Super League.

In 2013, IBB Polonia London established a partnership with one of the most successful clubs in Poland, PGE Skra Bełchatów, with the aim of popularising volleyball in the UK, promoting both clubs and exchanging experience in the field of training.

In March 2017, ex–Polish national team player, libero - Krzysztof Ignaczak, came out of retirement to join the club for the remainder of the 2016–17 season. As a then current World Champion, his presence at the club helped raise the profile of volleyball in Great Britain and in the world.

Teams

 Men's volleyball

References

External links
 Official Men's website
 Official Women's website

English volleyball clubs
Volleyball clubs established in 1973
Polish diaspora in the United Kingdom
Sports clubs in London
Sports clubs founded by the YMCA